Michael Sull (born 1949) is an IAMPETH master penman and author living in Mission, Kansas, United States. An expert on penmanship, he was Ronald Reagan's calligrapher after his presidency and is known worldwide for his skill and teaching ability. He regularly teaches handwriting, calligraphy, and engrossing programs throughout the United States, Europe and Asia.

Considered one of America's foremost living Spencerian penman, he is author of Spencerian Script and Ornamental Penmanship, Learning to Write Spencerian Script, and American Cursive Handwriting, and publishes various other educational materials focusing on pen writing. He also manufactures period style oblique dip pen equipment for use by penmen today.

In Geneva, Ohio (Platt R. Spencer's home town) Sull previously organized annual week-long seminars dedicated to Spencerian script known as the Spencerian Saga since 1987, wholly devoted to Spencerian Script and Ornamental Penmanship. The Spencerian Saga is now organized by Harvest Crittenden of Acorn Arts Studio.

Sull's career, however, didn't begin in the penmanship industry. After graduating from Syracuse University with a degree in forestry, he enlisted in the U.S. Navy. It wasn't until his discharge from the Service that he began to pursue his interest in calligraphy. Sull's penmanship has lent itself to a lengthy career in the field, enabling him to found a calligraphy guild, work as a calligrapher and lettering artist at Hallmark, and start his own ornamental penmanship company.

Today, Sull serves as Master Penman for Zaner-Bloser, performing public demonstrations. He is also the current Academic Director of Ink.Academy. He currently resides with his wife, Debra, in Mission, Kansas.

See also
Spencerian Script
IAMPETH
Illuminated manuscript

Notes

External links
Spencerian.com
IAMPETH Website

References
Hurford, R. (2006) "The books that saved an American heritage", IAMPETH Penman's Journal, Fall 2006, p. 6.
Sull, M.R. (1989) Spencerian script and ornamental penmanship (2 vv.). LDG Publishing, Mission, KS.
Sull, M.R. (1991) Learning to write Spencerian script (VHS videotape, DVD 2007). Lettering Design Group, Mission, KS.
Sull, M.R., Rapp, D.E. (1993) Learning to write Spencerian script. LDG Publishing, Mission, KS.
Sull, M.R. (1997) Off-hand flourishing techniques for ornamental penmanship (VHS videotape, DVD 2007). Lettering Design Group, Mission, KS.
Sull, M.R. (2006) "Michael Sull's Spencerian Saga marks twenty years", IAMPETH Penman's Journal, Fall 2006, p. 3.
Tanaka, Y. (2009) "Mike Sull brings Spencerian and offhand flourishing to Japan", IAMPETH Penman's Journal, Fall 2008/Winter 2009, p. 18.

Penmanship
Manuscript illuminators
Living people
American calligraphers
American non-fiction writers
1949 births
People from Mission, Kansas
People from Johnson County, Kansas